Storebotteggi is a mountain on the border of Vang Municipality in Innlandet county and Hemsedal Municipality in Viken county, Norway. The mountain is surrounded by several other notable mountains including Ørnenosi and Øyre to the northwest; Grindane, Rankonosi, and Klanten to the northeast; and Ranastongi and Blåkampen to the southeast.

See also
List of mountains of Norway by height

References

Hemsedal
Vang, Innlandet
Mountains of Innlandet
Mountains of Viken